The Mysterious Lady (French: La mystérieuse lady) is a 1936 French drama film directed by Robert Péguy and starring Fernand Mailly, Gina Manès and Jean Brochard.

Plot summary

Cast
 Fernand Mailly as Le colonel Leroy  
 Gina Manès as Lady Leroy 
 Jean Brochard 
 Fernand Fabre as L'agent secret  
 Simone Renant as La secrétaire

Bibliography 
 Crisp, Colin. Genre, Myth and Convention in the French Cinema, 1929-1939. Indiana University Press, 2002.

References

External links 
 
 

1936 drama films
French drama films
1936 films
1930s French-language films
Films directed by Robert Péguy
French black-and-white films
1930s French films